Bethpage High School is the only high school in Bethpage, New York. Located in Nassau County on Long Island, the school is situated at the corner of Stewart Avenue and Cherry Avenue, across from the Bethpage Community Park. On average, each class size is between 25 and 30 students.  Bethpage High School was once ranked by Newsweek at number 267 of the Best High Schools in America.

As of the 2020–21 school year, the school had an enrollment of 923 students and 81.82.3 classroom teachers (on an FTE basis), for a student–teacher ratio of 11.21.

Extracurricular activities

Performing arts
On January 16, 2007, the Bethpage High School Performing Arts Center was unveiled. The Center is home to the Bethpage Masquers Guild (Drama Club).

Spanish Club
Bethpage High School's Spanish Club embraces both Spanish culture and community service. Each year, the club works to organize cultural trips to museums and volunteers time at Winthrop Hospital at the Hispanic Health Fair. The club also sends aid to Spanish countries and holds an annual Foreign Film Night. The club is open to all students, regardless of language class taken or heritage.

Student Civic Association
The Bethpage High School Student Civic Association is a community service association composed of current attendees of Bethpage High School, open to all those students willing to join.  It holds an annual philanthropic talent show and numerous blood drives, and participates in national support programs including Hurricane relief, the annual Marty Lyons Christmas Party for terminally ill children, and various other altruistic endeavors.

Long Island Challenge appearance
In 2006, Bethpage High School was chosen to compete on The Long Island Challenge, an academic quiz show featuring Long Island high schools.  Team members included Raman Madan, Karan Sabharwal, Jeff Katz, Vinod Kasturi, and Steve Secchio.

Bethpage Robotics
The Bethpage Regal Eagles Robotics team was founded in 2009, and compete annually in the FIRST Robotics Competition, specifically at the New York City and SBPLI Long Island Regionals. For the first time in 2017, they will be competing at the new Hudson Valley Regional. The head mentors of the team include Dan Zabell and Eric Kay. The current Captain is senior Sam Perkowsky and the Co-Captain is Smiti Shah. They have won 3 notable awards: Woodie Flowers Finalist Award, Dean's List Finalist Award, and Rookie Inspiration Award. Their current sponsors include Altice USA, UTC, Plethora, Northrop Grumman, and TechClash.

Athletics
Bethpage offers numerous varsity athletic teams. They have a varsity program for football, baseball, basketball, soccer, lacrosse, softball, volleyball, badminton, golf, tennis, and kickline, among others. The Golden Eagles have won numerous county and conference championships across their varsity programs.

Varsity Kickline
The Golden Girls are a kickline/dance team which has won multiple awards. The team participates in the Kick, Pom, Jazz, and Hip Hop Categories (Lyrical and Team Routine in 2008). In 2006 and 2007, the Varsity Kickline became National Champions in the POM Category, and in 2008 placed 6th at the National Dance Alliance (NDA) Championship, where the team also placed 2nd in Kick in 2005. In 2009, the Golden Girls & Company won the Eastern Dance Association's National High Kick Title, as well as the All-Around Champion title, with a 2nd-place finish in the Large Pom category. In 2010, the Golden Girls placed 2nd in Kick, and won the Large Pom title.

Lacrosse 
The lacrosse team has had success throughout the years and commits to playing collegiate lacrosse every year. Since 2000, over 20 boys have gone on to play Division I and over 40 more players to play at the Division II & III levels.  Some notable alumni that either achieved All-American or have gone on to play Division I College Lacrosse; Todd Lawson, Tom Poggio, Dave Keenan, AJ Haugen, Rob Coscia, Dave Kelly, Brian Cerci, The Testa Brothers, Brian Solliday, Matt Rekowski, Trevor Michaelsen, Thomas John Michaelsen, Jordan Levine and many others. Around 10 players have gone on to play professional lacrosse. In 1996, Bethpage won their first and only State Championship Title which was helped by then, Assistant Coach Erwin Dill but then took over as the Head Coach from 1997 to 2014.

Wrestling
Ron Abitelli is the current head wrestling coach. They have successfully helped over 100 county place winners ranging from Champions to Six Place Finishers and 18 All-State wrestlers.

Soccer
Bethpage Soccer has been improving since the early 2000s after they won 4 consecutive conference championships from 2001-2004 and during the 2002 season, the team went undefeated.

Football
Football was coached by Howie Vogts, who helped the teams with 5 Long Island titles, 3 Rutger Cups, and 29 Regular Season or Conference Championships.
Under Vogts' direction, the Golden Eagles have made the Nassau County playoffs 25 times since in 1970, and every year since the playoff system expanded to four teams in 1984. Vogts' teams have won 29 regular season league or Conference Championships, 13 Conference Playoff Championships (ten since 1984), three Rutgers Cups, and five Long Island titles. Bethpage has had one Thorp Award winner, Dennis Macholz in 1968. Coach Vogts has had 39 winning seasons, only nine losing seasons, and three .500 seasons. In Vogts' first 23 seasons (1953–1976) his teams were 96-75-7 for a winning percentage of .557. Since then (1977–2005), Vogts' teams have had a Nassau County record 30 consecutive winning seasons, with an astonishing record of 246-39-3 (.865 winning percentage). Under Coach Vogts' helm he coached many stellar athletes who have gone on to play College Football like Craig Swanson, John Beachy & Dennis Macholz in addition to coaching many athletes that have gone on to play collegiate lacrosse like Trevor Michaelsen who holds and ties three Long Island Kicking Records with the (Most PAT's in a game 8, most PAT's Season 56, and most career PAT's 88) and many more great athletes.. Vogts is the winningest high school coach in New York State with a record of 342-114-10.

Notable alumni
 Steve Grossman, former jazz fusion and hard bop saxophonist.
 Jordan Levine, men's lacrosse coach, Mercy College
 Chuck Lorre, television producer
 Thomas Michaelsen, professional lacrosse player and founder of 365lax Inc.
 Alex Reynolds, professional wrestler, All Elite Wrestling
 Dan Rich, entrepreneur 
 Joe Sambito, former professional baseball player, Boston Red Sox, Houston Astros, and New York Mets

References

1960 establishments in New York (state)
Educational institutions established in 1960
Public high schools in New York (state)
Schools in Nassau County, New York